As of September 2016, the International Union for Conservation of Nature (IUCN) lists 65 extinct fish species, 87 possibly extinct fish species, and six extinct in the wild fish species.

Cartilaginous fish

Possibly extinct species
Lost shark (Carcharhinus obsoletus)
Red Sea torpedo (Torpedo suessii)
Java stingaree (Urolophus javanicus)

Populations 
Mediterranean sand tiger shark (Carcharias taurus europaeus)

Lampreys

Extinct species
Ukrainian migratory lamprey Eudontomyzon sp. 'migratory'

Possibly extinct species
Tetrapleurodon spadiceus (Tetrapleurodon spadiceus)

Ray-finned fishes
There are 64 extinct species, 85 possibly extinct species, and six extinct in the wild species of ray-finned fish evaluated by the IUCN.

Acipenseriformes

Chinese paddlefish (Psephurus gladius)

Salmoniformes

Extinct species

Possibly extinct species
Coregonus hoferi
Shortnose cisco (Coregonus reighardi)
Extinct in the wild species
Kunimasu (Oncorhynchus kawamurae)
Inconnu (Stenodus leucichthys)

Toothcarps

Extinct species

Possibly extinct species

Extinct in the wild species

Cypriniformes

Extinct species

Possibly extinct species

Gasterosteiformes

Extinct species
Techirghiol stickleback (Gasterosteus crenobiontus)

Osmeriformes

Extinct species
New Zealand grayling (Prototroctes oxyrhynchus)

Catfishes

Extinct species
Scioto madtom (Noturus trautmani)
Siamese flat-barbelled catfish (Platytropius siamensis)
Possibly extinct species

Perciformes

Extinct species

Possibly extinct species

Clupeiformes

Possibly extinct species
Alosa vistonica

Scorpaeniformes

Extinct species
Utah Lake sculpin (Cottus echinatus)

Anglerfish

Extinct species 

 Smooth handfish (Sympterichthys unipennis)

See also 
 List of least concern fishes
 List of near threatened fishes
 List of vulnerable fishes
 List of endangered fishes
 List of critically endangered fishes
 List of data deficient fishes
 Sustainable seafood advisory lists and certification

References 

 

 01
 
Recently extinct
Fish, Recently
Fish, Recent
Extinct, Recent
Recently extinct fish